Richard Willard Armour (July 15, 1906 – February 28, 1989) was an American poet and prose writer who wrote more than 65 books.

Life and works 
Armour was born in San Pedro, Los Angeles, California the only child of Harry W. and Sue Wheelock Armour. His father was  a druggist, and Armour's autobiographical Drug Store Days recalls his childhood in both San Pedro and Pomona. He attended Pomona College and Harvard University, where he studied with the eminent Shakespearean scholar George Lyman Kittredge and obtained a Ph.D. in English philology. He was married to Kathleen Stevens and they had two children, Geoffrey and Karin, and he eventually became Professor of English at Scripps College and the Claremont Graduate School in Claremont, California.  In 1968, Armour was awarded an honorary Doctor of Humane Letters (L.H.D.) degree from Whittier College.

In his early career he focused on serious literature, publishing (in 1935) a biography of the lesser English poet Bryan Waller Procter and in 1940, co-editing (with Raymond F. Howes) a series of observations by contemporaries about Samuel Taylor Coleridge, Coleridge the Talker. Virginia Woolf cited this work in an essay stating, "Two pious American editors have collected the comments of this various company [Coleridge's acquaintances], and they are, of course, various. Yet it is the only way of getting at the truth—to have it broken into many splinters by many mirrors and so select."

Armour wrote humorous poems—light verse—in a style reminiscent of Ogden Nash. These poems were often featured in newspaper Sunday supplements in a feature called Armour's Armory. Many of Armour's poems have been repeatedly and incorrectly attributed to Nash. Probably Armour's most-quoted poem (often incorrectly attributed to Nash) is the quatrain: "Shake and shake / the catsup bottle / none will come / and then a lot'll." Another popular quatrain of his, also usually attributed erroneously to Nash, is: "Nothing attracts / the mustard from wieners / as much as the slacks / just back from the cleaners."

Armour also wrote satirical books, such as Twisted Tales from Shakespeare, and his ersatz history of the United States, It All Started With Columbus. These books were typically filled with puns and plays on words, and gave the impression of someone who had not quite been paying attention in class, thus also getting basic facts not quite right, to humorous effect.

As an example: "In an attempt to take Baltimore, the British attacked Fort McHenry, which protected the harbor. Bombs were soon bursting in air, rockets were glaring, and all in all it was a moment of great historical interest. During the bombardment, a young lawyer named Francis "Off" Key wrote The Star-Spangled Banner, and when, by the dawn's early light, the British heard it sung, they fled in terror!"

It All Started with Europa begins in the wilderness full of "fierce animals ready to spring and fierce birds ready to chirp."

It All Started with Marx includes the rabble-rousing Lenin declaring in public "Two pants with every suit!," "Two suits with every pants!" and "The Tsar is a tsap!"

It All started with Eve quotes Napoleon as writing in a letter "Do you [ Joséphine ] miss me? I hope the enemy artillery does."

His book The Classics Reclassified includes take-offs on works such as The Iliad, Julius Caesar by William Shakespeare, David Copperfield by Charles Dickens, etc.; each take-off is prefaced by a short biography of the work's author in the same style. For Shakespeare, it says he "was baptized April 26, 1564. When he was born is disputed, but anyone who argues that it was after this date is just being difficult."

Armour's books are typically written in a style parodying dull academic tomes, with many footnotes (funny in themselves), fake bibliographies, quiz sections, and glossaries. This style was pioneered by the British humorists W. C. Sellar and R. J. Yeatman with their parody of British history 1066 and All That in the 1930s.

A preface of one book noted "The reader will not encounter any half-truths, but may occasionally encounter a truth-and-a-half."

Bibliography

Books

Poetry 
Collections
 
 
 
 
 
 
 
 
  
 
Anthologies (edited)
 
List of poems

Appearance on You Bet Your Life 

In 1957, Armour appeared on the television game show You Bet Your Life.  After introductions, host Groucho Marx repeated the show's famous catch-phrase, "Say the secret word, win a hundred dollars."  Each episode of the show had a secret, common word (i.e. home, head, door) and if the contestant said the word during his/her interview, then the partnered contestants would each get $50.  In this particular case, Armour caught the host in a semantic trap, by immediately stating, "The secret word."  He then demanded his $100. After a very brief moment of confusion the band broke out with a short medley indicating that the secret word had been said.  Announcer and assistant George Fenneman then arrived on camera and turned to Armour, "From the C.O. over here that we will allow you to do what you just did. But nobody else better try this. That's what they said."  Armour replied, "Thank you, very much." And Fenneman left the frame and responded, "You're welcome," quickly caught himself, and almost cut himself off stating, "I had nothing to do with it." Normally when the secret word is said, Groucho immediately hands over cash. He did not hand over the cash and it's unclear if they paid Armour the bonus even after Armour and his partner won the game. He also composed the following poem that he read to Groucho.

To Groucho

Most poets write of Meadowlarks
I sing instead of Groucho Marx
His lustrous eyes, each like a star
His noble brow, his sweet cigar
His manly stride, his soft moustache
His easy way with sponsors' cash
His massive shoulders, brawny arms
His intellect, his many charms
In short, unless the truth I stray from
A man to keep your wife away from.

He also recited a couple of other humorous poems on the program.

Sources

References

1906 births
1989 deaths
American humorous poets
Claremont Graduate University faculty
George Washington University alumni
Harvard University alumni
The New Yorker people
Poets from California
Pomona College alumni
Scripps College faculty
20th-century American poets